O'Leno State Park is a Florida State Park located on the Santa Fe River  six miles north of High Springs on U.S. 441. Many facilities at the park were built by the Civilian Conservation Corps in the 1930s.

History
A town called Keno, also the name of a lotto gambling game, was once at the location of the park. There was a cotton gin and a sawmill there. In 1876, ministers and businessmen moved to change the name to Leno to improve the town's reputation. The current name refers to "Old Leno". After the railroad bypassed the town, it became a ghost town.

Geology
The park is made up of sinkholes, hardwood hammocks, river swamps, and sandhills.  The Santa Fe River runs through the park, disappearing into a sinkhole and re-appearing approximately 3.5 miles away at River Rise Preserve State Park, forming a natural land bridge.  At one time, the historic Bellamy Road ran across this land bridge.

Fauna
Among the wildlife of the park are white-tailed deer, squirrel, alligators, turtles, raccoons and gopher tortoises.

Recreational activities
Amenities include a more than 13 miles of hiking, biking and horseback riding trails, picnic pavilions, and a full-facility campground which includes family, primitive, youth and group camping.

Hours
O'Leno State Park is open between 8 a.m. and sundown every day of the year (including holidays).

Gallery

References

External links

 O'Leno State Park at Florida State Parks

Parks in Columbia County, Florida
State parks of Florida
Civilian Conservation Corps in Florida
1930s establishments in Florida
National Park Service rustic in Florida